Battle of Negapatam may refer one of the third battles between French and British fleets off the coast of Negapatam in India :

 Battle of Negapatam (1746) during the First Carnatic War (part of the War of the Austrian Succession)
 Battle of Negapatam (1758) during the Third Carnatic War (part of the Seven Years' War)
 Battle of Negapatam (1782) during the Anglo-French War of 1778-1783